The Boys' 200 metres at the 2009 World Youth Championships in Athletics was held at the Brixen-Bressanone Sport Arena on 10, 11, and 12 July. The event was won by Kirani James of Grenada, who also won the 400 metres.

Medalists

Records 
Prior to the competition, the following records were as follows.

No new records were set during the competition.

Heats 
Qualification rule: first 2 of each heat (Q) plus the 4 fastest times (q) qualified.

Semifinals 
Qualification rule: first 2 of each heat (Q) plus the 2 fastest times (q) qualified.

Heat 1 

Key:  PB = Personal best, SB = Seasonal best

Wind: 0.6 m/s

Heat 2 

Key:  PB = Personal best, SB = Seasonal best

Wind: 0.9 m/s

Heat 3 

Key:  PB = Personal best, SB = Seasonal best

Wind: 1.4 m/s

Final 

Key:  PB = Personal best, SB = Seasonal best

Wind: −0.9 m/s

References 

World Youth Championships 2009

2009 World Youth Championships in Athletics